Wilczewo  is a village in the administrative district of Gmina Stawiski, within Kolno County, Podlaskie Voivodeship, in north-eastern Poland. The village has a population of 106.

References

Wilczewo